The English Reformed Church is one of the oldest buildings in Amsterdam, situated in the centre of the city.  It is home to an English-speaking congregation which is affiliated to the Church of Scotland and to the Protestant Church in the Netherlands (formerly Dutch Reformed Church).

See also 
List of Church of Scotland parishes
Dutch Church, Austin Friars of London, England

References

Further reading

External links

 English Reformed Church, Amsterdam

Church of Scotland churches
Churches in Amsterdam
Presbyterian churches in Europe
Rijksmonuments in Amsterdam
Reformed church buildings in the Netherlands